Shudhu Tomari Jonyo is a 2015 bengali romantic drama film directed by Birsa Dasgupta and produced by Shree Venkatesh Films. The film stars Dev, Srabanti Chatterjee, Soham and Mimi Chakraborty in the lead roles. It is a remake of the Tamil film Raja Rani (2013) which was reported to have been inspired by the 2007 Kannada movie Milana which was also remade in Bengali as Ki Kore Toke Bolbo and released four months after this movie's release.

Cast
 Dev as Adi Sen
 Srabanti Chatterjee as Nayantara Sen
 Soham Chakraborty as Siraz Chowdhury
 Mimi Chakraborty as Koli
 Biswanath Basu as Chandan
 Sneha Chatterjee as Sreetama 
 Arindam Sil as Nayantara's father
 Supriyo Dutta as Siraz's father
 Kharaj Mukherjee as Kangsho Mama, Chandan's maternal uncle
 Kanchan Mullick as Rohan 
 Pallavi Chatterjee as Nayantara's aunt
 Manasi Sinha as Kangsho's wife
 Ashim Roy Chowdhury as Chapal
 Pradip Dhar as Bhabha
 Nilanjan Dutta
 Poddanab Dasgupta
 Debprotim Dasgupta as Chhoto Bhonda
 Trina Saha as Adi's relative

Ratings & Critics Score
Anandolok Magazine 4.25/5
IMDB 7.6/10

Soundtrack

The soundtrack was composed by Arindom Chatterjee. One track (Dekhte Bou Bou) was retained from a song (Hey Baby) of Tamil version of this movie. The songs were declared hits. The track Egiye de is inspired by the song Coming home.

References 

Bengali-language Indian films
2010s Bengali-language films 
Films scored by Arindam Chatterjee
2015 films
Bengali remakes of Tamil films
Indian romantic drama films
Films directed by Birsa Dasgupta
2015 romantic drama films